Events from the year 1585 in Ireland.

Incumbent
Monarch: Elizabeth I

Events
January – Sorley Boy MacDonnell lands at Cushendun with a substantial army, but after initial successes is driven back to Scotland.
April 26–May 25 – Parliament of Ireland meets in Dublin with Sir Nicholas Walsh as Speaker of the Irish House of Commons. Gerald FitzGerald, 11th Earl of Kildare, is permitted to take his seat.
April – Roman Catholic recusants in Clonmel are betrayed and seized at Passion Sunday mass by troops of John Norreys, Lord President of Munster, and the celebrant, fugitive priest Maurice MacKenraghty, gives himself up, is immediately tried under martial law as a traitor, and executed. His head is set up in Clonmel market place and his body buried behind the high altar of the Franciscan convent.
July 15 – Composition of Connacht: A commission is given to Sir Richard Bingham, governor of Connacht, and others to make agreements with landowners in the province by 3 October. Murrough na dTuadh Ó Flaithbheartaigh is recognised as Chief of the Name of Ó Flaithbertaigh in Galway.
July–August – Sir John Perrot, Lord Deputy of Ireland, is in Ulster; he confirms agreement between the O'Neill dynasty on 10 August and establishes County Coleraine (as the County of Colerain) and County Monaghan.
October – Sorley Boy MacDonnell, having returned to Ireland, recaptures Dunluce Castle.
November 16 – Gerald FitzGerald, 11th Earl of Kildare, dies in exile in London and is succeeded by his son Henry FitzGerald.
December 14 – Nicholas Walsh, Church of Ireland Bishop of Ossory, is stabbed to death in his house in Kilkenny by a disaffected member of his flock.
December – Munster Plantation planned.
Tadhg mac Diarmata, last de facto King of Magh Luirg, is succeeded by Brian na Carriag MacDermot, first to be styled "MacDermot of the Carrick".

Arts and literature
Tuileagna Ó Maoil Chonaire composes the poem .
Máel Sechnaill Ruadh Ó Braonáin of Galway is recorded as one of the last harpers of the period in Connacht.

Births
Thomas Preston, 1st Viscount Tara, soldier (d. 1655)
Possible date – Sir Dominick Browne, merchant and landowner (d. c.1656)

Deaths
April 30 – Maurice MacKenraghty, Roman Catholic priest and martyr.
November 16 – Gerald FitzGerald, 11th Earl of Kildare (b. 1525)
December 14 – Nicholas Walsh, Church of Ireland Bishop of Ossory and biblical translator.

References

 
1580s in Ireland
Ireland
Years of the 16th century in Ireland